Rasmus Lund Pedersen (born 9 July 1998) is a Danish road and track cyclist, who currently rides for UCI Continental team . He competed at the 2019 UCI Track Cycling World Championships, winning a bronze medal.

Major results

Track

2015
 2nd  Team pursuit, UEC European Junior Championships
 2nd Team pursuit, UCI Track World Cup, Hong Kong
2016
 2nd  Individual pursuit, UCI Junior World Championships
2018
 UCI World Cup
1st Team pursuit, Saint-Quentin-en-Yvelines
1st Team pursuit, Milton
2nd Team pursuit, Berlin
2019
 1st  Team pursuit, UEC European Championships
 UCI World Cup
1st Team pursuit, Glasgow
1st Team pursuit, Minsk
 3rd  Team pursuit, UCI World Championships
2020
 1st  Team pursuit, UCI World Championships
2021
 1st  Team pursuit, UEC European Championships
 1st  Madison (with Matias Malmberg), National Championships
 2nd  Team pursuit, Olympic Games
2022
 2nd  Team pursuit, UEC European Championships
 3rd  Team pursuit, UCI Track World Championships
 3rd Team pursuit, UCI Nations Cup, Glasgow

Road
2015
 1st  Road race, National Junior Championships
 3rd  Road race, UCI Junior Road World Championships
 8th Overall Trophée Centre Morbihan
 10th Overall Course de la Paix Juniors
1st Stage 4
2016
 3rd Road race, National Junior Championships
 5th Overall Course de la Paix Juniors
1st Stage 1
 5th Overall Trophée Centre Morbihan
1st Stage 3

References

External links

1998 births
Living people
Danish track cyclists
Danish male cyclists
UCI Track Cycling World Champions (men)
Olympic cyclists of Denmark
Cyclists at the 2020 Summer Olympics
Medalists at the 2020 Summer Olympics
Olympic silver medalists for Denmark
Olympic medalists in cycling
21st-century Danish people